Fontcouverte is a commune in the Aude department in southern France.

Population

Sights
Monument Saint Régis
Fountain on the Place de la Révolution, built in the late 19th century
A column 4.40 m high with a statue of a woman symbolizing agriculture
Montagne d'Alaric

See also
 Corbières AOC
 Communes of the Aude department

References

Communes of Aude
Aude communes articles needing translation from French Wikipedia